Henry Webb may refer to:

 Henry Richard Webb (1829–1901), New Zealand politician
 Sir Henry Webb, 1st Baronet (1866–1940), British politician
H. Walter Webb (1856–1900), United States journalist
Henry J. Webb (1846–1893), English scholar
Hank Webb (born 1950), United States Major League Baseball player
 Henry Webb (actor) (1906–1990), British actor in Hadleigh (TV series)

See also
Henry Webbe, MP for Devizes

Harry Webb (disambiguation)